Paola del Carmen Villamizar Ochoa (born 30 June 1994) is a Venezuelan professional footballer who plays as a midfielder for Mexican Liga MX Femenil side Club Tijuana  and the Venezuela women's national team.

International career
Villamizar represented Venezuela at the 2014 South American U-20 Women's Championship. At senior level, she made her debut on 5 April 2018, in a Copa América Femenina match against Ecuador.

References

External links
 
 
 
 

1994 births
Living people
People from Aragua
Venezuelan women's footballers
Women's association football midfielders
Women's association football forwards
Santos FC (women) players
Santiago Morning (women) footballers
Club Tijuana (women) footballers
Campeonato Brasileiro de Futebol Feminino Série A1 players
Liga MX Femenil players
Venezuela women's international footballers
Venezuelan expatriate women's footballers
Venezuelan expatriate sportspeople in Brazil
Expatriate women's footballers in Brazil
Venezuelan expatriate sportspeople in Chile
Expatriate women's footballers in Chile
Venezuelan expatriate sportspeople in Mexico
Expatriate women's footballers in Mexico